2020–21 UAE Division two is the second season of newly formed third tier Emirati football league and it will be the first to be completed as the 2019–20 season was cancelled due to the COVID-19 pandemic. This season will feature 15 teams split into two groups, one containing 8 teams while the other containing 7. This season will see an increase in teams from the previous season which only included 10 teams. This season will include the majority of last year's participants with the exception of Quattro and Al Falah who both are supposed to be promoted to the UAE First Division League but their step towards the 2nd tier league was denied due to the cancellation and difficult facilities of the clubs preventing them from climbing the UAE football pyramid. Abtal Al Khaleej were crowned the champions of this season after defeating City 3–0 in the final.

Stadia and locations
Note: Table lists clubs in alphabetical order.

Group A

Group B

League tables

Group A

Group B

Playoffs

Results

Group A

Group B

Number of teams by Emirates

References

2020–21 in Emirati football